Hans Hanan Wellisch (April 25, 1920 - February 6, 2004) was a librarian, LIS educator, and indexer known for his work with the International Federation for Documentation (later International Federation for Information and Documentation), contributing to the Universal Decimal Classification. He headed the committee which translated the abridgement of the UDC into Hebrew and was the compiler of the index to the system.

Wellisch graduated from high school and was arrested in November 1938, and sent to Dachau concentration camp. When arrested he already had a visa to Sweden, so he was sent there after two and a half months. There he briefly worked in the special library of the Swedish Cooperative Federation which gave him some training in librarianship. He emigrated to Israel in 1949 where he was the librarian of the Signal Corps of the Israel Defense Forces. He received a grant from the United Nations to study at the University of Maryland in 1967. The university invited him to join the School of Library Science as a visiting lecturer two years later. He worked there for the rest of his professional career, and earned a Masters in Library Science in 1972 and a Ph.D. in 1975. He retired from UMD in 1989 as a full professor.

He was the first recipient of the American Society of Indexers Indexing Award for the index to his own book, The Conversion of Scripts: Its Nature, History and Utilization. He also won the Hines Award for "continuous dedicated and exceptional service" to the ASI where he was president from 1984 to 1985.

Personal life
Wellisch was born in Vienna.  He was married to Shulamith Wellisch, and the couple had three children Tamar, Ilana  and Yuval Wellisch.

Publications
Wellisch, H. H. (1975). Transcription and transliteration: An annotated bibliography on conversion of scripts. Silver Spring, Md: Institute of Modern Languages.
Wellisch, Hans (Hanan) (June 1975). "Conrad Gessner: a bio-bibliography". Journal of the Society for the Bibliography of Natural History. 7 (2): 151–247. 
Wellisch, H. H. (1976). “Relative Importance of the World’s Major Scripts.” Libri: International Journal of Libraries & Information Services 26 (September): 238–50.
Wellisch, Hans H. (1977).  The PRECIS index system: principles, applications, and prospects : proceedings of the International PRECIS Workshop, October 15–17, 1976. New York: Wilson.
Wellisch, H. H. (1978). The conversion of scripts, its nature, history, and utilization. New York: Wiley.
Wellisch. Hans H. (1978). “Script Conversion and Bibliographic Control of Documents in Dissimilar Scripts: Problems and Alternatives.” International Library Review 10 (January): 3–22. 
Wellisch, Hans H. (1980). “Bibliographic Access to Multilingual Collections.” Library Trends 29 (October): 223–44.
Wellisch, H. H. (1980). Indexing and abstracting: An international bibliography. Santa Barbara, Calif: ABC-Clio.
Wellisch, Hans H. (1981). “Ebla: The World's Oldest Library.” The Journal of Library History 16, no. 3, 1981, pp. 488–500.
Wellisch, Hans H. (1983). “ALA Filing Rules: Flowcharts Illustrating Their Application, with a Critique and Suggestions for Improvement.” Journal of the American Society for Information Science 34 (September): 313–30.
Wellisch, H. H., & Gessner, C. (1984). Conrad Gessner: A bio-bibliography. Zug, Switzerland: IDC.
Wellisch, Hans, H. (1986). "The Oldest Printed Indexes." The Indexer 15 no 2 October., pp. 1–10.
Wellisch, Hans  H. (1986). The First Arab Bibliography : Fihrist Al-ʻUlum. Occasional Papers / University of Illinois, Graduate School of Library and Information Science: No. 175. Board of Trustees of the University of Illinois.
Wellisch, Hans H. (1991). Indexing from A to Z. Bronx, N.Y.: H.W. Wilson.
Wellisch, Hans H. (1994). “Incunabula Indexes.” Indexer 19 (April): 3–12. 
Wellisch, Hans H. (1998) "Cultivating the Garden of Librarianship". Cataloging & Classification Quarterly, 25:4, 289-304.

References

1920 births
2004 deaths
Indexers
Austrian Jews
People from Vienna
Austrian expatriates in Sweden
Austrian emigrants to Israel
Israeli emigrants to the United States